Steve Glynn was the first head football coach for the now-defunct Siena College Saints football program. He coached in 1965 and 1966 and compiled a record of 3–8.

Playing career
Glynn graduated from Lynbrook High School in Lynbrook, New York in 1958. After serving in the United States Army, Glynn attended but did not graduate from C.W. Post Campus of Long Island University (C.W. Post). At C.W. Post he played football from 1961–1962.

Head coaching record

References

Possibly living people
Year of birth missing
LIU Post Pioneers football players
Siena Saints football coaches
Lynbrook Senior High School alumni